The Galway Workers and General Labourers Union was established in August 1911 by William O'Halloran and a number of other dock labourers. Within a short period, following discussions with James O'Connor Kessack, it was absorbed by the Liverpool-based National Union of Dock Labourers, later the Amalgamated Transport and General Workers Union

Defunct trade unions of Ireland

Trade unions established in 1911
1911 establishments in Ireland